Yext is a New York City technology company operating in the area of online brand management. It offers brand updates using its cloud-based network of apps, search engines and other facilities. The company was founded in 2006 by Howard Lerman, Brian Distelburger, and Brent Metz. Recent figures showed a market capitalization in 2019 of more than $2.0 billion and a revenue of $354.7 million for the 2021 fiscal year.

History
Yext was founded in 2006 as a local advertising business.  By 2009, it was generating $20 million in revenue after switching its business model to generate leads for its customers through a pay-per-call model.

In August 2012, the company sold its pay-per-call business to IAC's CityGrid Media in order to focus on listings. By that time, Yext had raised $65.8 million in funding and handled 950,000 updates for 50,000 businesses.

Investors included Sutter Hill Ventures, Institutional Venture Partners, and WGI investments. By 2016, the company had $89 million in revenue and had expanded its offices at One Madison Avenue to 95,000 square feet. 

In 2016, the company was ranked #60 on the Deloitte Fast 500 North America list.

In 2017, Yext debuted on the New York Stock Exchange.  According to Forbes, the company's market capitalization is $2 billion.

For the fiscal year 2021, Yext reported a revenue of $354.7 million. Users of Yext's search tool include the U.S. State Department and the World Health Organization. In 2021, Yext had agreements with companies such as Verizon, Marriott, and Samsung. In September 2021, the company launched an artificial intelligence tool for health care organizations. "Find-a-Doc" helps patients identify healthcare professionals by using natural language processing (NLP).

References

Digital marketing companies of the United States
Marketing companies established in 2006
2017 initial public offerings
Companies listed on the New York Stock Exchange
2006 establishments in New York City
Software companies established in 2006